Out of the Blue is the seventh studio album released by Australian country music singer Anne Kirkpatrick. The album was released in 1991. The album has been heralded as "a watershed album in Australian country music" and Kirkpatrick's "breakthrough album".

At the ARIA Music Awards of 1992, Kirkpatrick was awarded the ARIA Award for Best Country Album; this was Kirkpatrick's first ARIA Award.

At the Country Music Awards of Australia of 1992, Kirkpatrick won two golden guitar's; "Album of the Year" and "Female Vocalist of the Year" for the track "I Guess We've Been Together Too Long". This is the second time Kirkpatrick has won this award; her last coming in 1979.

Track listing

Personnel

Release history

References

1991 albums
ARIA Award-winning albums